Junzhuang Town is a town on northeastern Mentougou District, Beijing, China. It is located on the south of Sujiatuo and Wenquan Towns, west of Xiangshan Subdistrict, north of Wulituo Subdistrict and Longquan Town, and East of Miaofengshan Town. In the year 2020, its population was 16,128.

The town took its name Junzhuang due to the fact that historically this region was frequently used as a station for military personnels.

History

Administrative Divisions 
As of 2021, Junzhuang Town was formed by 11 subdivisions, composed of 3 communities and 8 villages:

See also 

 List of township-level divisions of Beijing

References 

Mentougou District
Towns in Beijing